The 1951 Canadian census was a detailed enumeration of the Canadian population. The total population count was 14,009,429, representing a 21.8% increase over the 1941 census population count of 11,506,655. The 1951 census was the ninth comprehensive decennial census since Canadian Confederation on 1 July 1867. 

The previous census was the Northwest Provinces of Alberta, Saskatchewan, and Manitoba 1946 census and the following census was the 1956 censusthe first quinquennial, rather than decennial, nationwide census.

This was the first census to include Newfoundland, having joined Confederation only two years prior.

Canada's Statistics Act legislation does not permit the release of personal information until 92 years have elapsed. Detailed information from this census is not due for release until 2042.

Population by province 

Ontario added the largest number of new residents since the 1941 census, while British Columbia saw the highest growth rate among the provinces, becoming the first western province to reach one million inhabitants. Saskatchewan experienced a second consecutive decade of population decline, falling behind both Alberta and British Columbia in size.

Population by religion

References

1951 in Canada
1951
Canada